Georgette Mulheir was the chief executive of Lumos, an international non-governmental organisation, founded in 2005 by J. K. Rowling to end the institutionalisation of orphaned children throughout the world, from 2011–2019. Her model of deinstitutionalisation, pioneered since 1993, has been followed in many countries across Eastern and central Europe.

Biography
Mulheir was born in Oldham in 1968. She has two brothers and a sister. Her father was a carpenter and her mother was a residential social worker. After studying music at Sheffield University, she worked for Sheffield Social Services from 1991 in a mother and baby unit. Since 1993 when she moved to Romania to set up the first mother and baby unit in Bucharest she has pioneered a model of deinstitutionalisation which is now followed in many countries across Central and Eastern Europe. Between 1993 and 2015, the number of children in Romanian orphanages has reduced from 200,000 to 20,000.

In 2007 she was appointed operations director of Lumos, becoming chief executive in 2011. She was a member of the Ad Hoc Expert Group which produced a report on the Transition from Institutional to Community-based Care for the European Commission in 2009. Mulheir is a member of the governing council of the Global Alliance for Children, established in 2013. She also is advisor to the European Commission on the reform of children's services.

In 2014 Mulheir was named as one of the 30 most influential social workers in the world, on a list compiled by the US website Social Work Degree Guide.

Professional Work 
When Mulheir was a teenager she was a member of the anti-apartheid movement and Amnesty International. When she was attending a university she did volunteer work with sexual abuse survivors and refugees. In the local community she helped women learn the language of English. Georgette Mulheir performed some volunteer work in Romania previous to her work at Lumos. Mulheir set up a service in Romania that helped teenage mothers keep their children, as one of her first projects in 1991. In 1993, she started the development of a mother and baby unit in Romania to end institutionalisation. Over the next 10 years, she worked with communities and governments in Romania and helped the government develop a plan that reduced institution numbers by 95%. Georgette has done work with institutions in 23 countries since then. Currently, Georgette and her colleagues are looking to develop new programs in Ukraine and Hungary. Mulheir is also working to build the organisation's profile to display the work being done at the organisation. She focuses her work in central and eastern Europe because these places have the biggest problems Lumos has a huge success story in Moldova where there has been a 70% decrease in the number of children in institutions over a six-year span. Lumos help Moldova to set up an education system and worked with parents to prepare them for when the children left the institutions. Mulheir is fluent in Romanian and can have conversations in French, Arabic, and Croatian. The charity split, with the Romanian branch deciding to go their own way.

Georgette has published four books on children's rights. She is a member of the Commission on Civil Society and Democratic Engagement. She was named in the US as one of the world's most influential social workers in 2014 by socialworkdegree.com. In the US, in 2015, she was honoured in the 6th Tribeca Disruptive Innovation Awards for her work. Georgette has been head of Hope and Homes, where she was a social services consultant.

In May 2012, Georgette Mulheir gave a TED Talk on the tragedy of orphanages, encouraging people to find alternate sources for supporting children.

She was asked to step down from her position as CEO of Lumos in July 2019 after the organisation said there were "management and culture challenges" that needed "immediate action".

Books and publications

References

External links
The tragedy of orphanages: talk by Georgette Mulheir, presented at TEDSalon London Spring 2012 

British social workers
Child care
Year of birth missing (living people)
Living people